Town Green railway station is a railway station in Town Green, Aughton, Lancashire, England, situated on the Ormskirk branch of Merseyrail's Northern Line.

Location
It is located at the junction of Town Green Lane and Middlewood Road with pedestrian and vehicular access from Middlewood Road. The booking hall opens onto the south bound platform and the Aughton police station now occupies rooms opening off the booking hall.

Facilities
The station is staffed throughout the day, with the ticket office open from start of service until 00:20.  There is a waiting room in the main building and a shelter on the opposite side, with a footbridge linking them.  Digital display screens, timetable posters and automatic announcements are used to convey train running information.  There are lifts available and step-free access to both platforms.

Services
Trains operate every 15 minutes (Monday to Saturday daytime) between Ormskirk and Liverpool Central, and every 30 minutes in the evening and all day Sunday.

History 
Town Green station was regularly used as an overnight base for the Royal trains when the Royal family were visiting Knowsley Hall – the home of Lord Derby or attending the Grand National race meeting at Aintree. see Royal Trains List (p19/204) . To the Liverpool end of Town Green station on the Ormskirk bound side and behind the signal box there used to be a small loop line with a very low white painted station which was the platform used by the train. this now forms the car park of the Aughton Institute

The signal box (erected by British Railways in 1949 to replace an earlier Lancashire and Yorkshire Railway structure dating from 1875) was closed and demolished when the line was resignalled in February 1994 – from October 1970 until its demise, it remotely operated the points and signalling at Ormskirk as well as at this station.

Gallery

References

External links

Railway stations in the Borough of West Lancashire
DfT Category E stations
Former Lancashire and Yorkshire Railway stations
Railway stations served by Merseyrail
Railway stations in Great Britain opened in 1849
Aughton, West Lancashire